is a city located in Ishikawa Prefecture, Japan. , the city had an estimated population of 22,052 in 8566 households, and a population density of 270 persons per km².

Geography
Hakui occupies the southwestern neck of Noto Peninsula and is bordered by the Sea of Japan on west, and Toyama Prefecture to the east. Parts of the city are within the borders of the Noto Hantō Quasi-National Park.

Neighbouring municipalities 
Ishikawa Prefecture
Nakanoto
Shika
Hōdatsushimizu
Toyama Prefecture
Himi

Climate
Hakui has a humid continental climate (Köppen Cfa) characterized by mild summers and cold winters with heavy snowfall.  The average annual temperature in Hakui is 13.9 °C. The average annual rainfall is 2452 mm with September as the wettest month. The temperatures are highest on average in August, at around 26.4 °C, and lowest in January, at around 4.0 °C.

Demographics
Per Japanese census data, the population of Hakui has declined over the past 40 years.

History 
The area around Hakui has been settled since the pre-Jōmon period was part of ancient Noto Province. The ichinomiya of Noto province, Keta Taisha is located in Hakui, and shrine legend asserts that this is the location at which Ōkuninushi landed with 300 of his folders from Izumo to subdue the inhabitants of Noto Peninsula during the reign of the demi-legendary 8th Emperor Kōgen or 10th Emperor Sujin. The name of "Hakui" is derived from the kanji 羽 (ha), meaning feathers, and 咋 (kui) meaning "to eat". This name comes from an ancient legend which tells of Prince Iwatsuku (the son of Emperor Kōgen) killing a monstrous bird which plagued the area. The Prince's dogs went to the beast's body and pulled away mouthfuls of feathers.

During the Sengoku Period the area was contested by the Uesugi clan and Maeda clan. The area became part Kaga Domain under the Edo period Tokugawa shogunate. Following the Meiji restoration, the area was organised into Hakui District, Ishikawa.

The town of Hakui was established with the creation of the modern municipalities system on April 1, 1889. It was raised to city status on July 1, 1958.

Government
Hakui has a mayor-council form of government with a directly elected mayor and a unicameral city legislature of 14 members.

Economy 
Hakui is a regional commercial centre for the southern Noto area. Hakui is noted for its silk and artificial textile production. Agriculture is also a major contributor to the local economy.

Education
Hakui has six public elementary schools and two middle schools operated by the city government, and three public high school operated by the Ishikawa Prefectural Board of Education.

Transportation

Railway
  West Japan Railway Company - Nanao Line
 -  -

Highway

Sister city relations
 - Tongzhou District, Nantong, Jiangsu, China - friendship city since May 22, 2001

Local attractions

Keta Taisha, ichinomiya of Noto province
Chirihama Nagisa Driveway
Space and UFO Museum Cosmo Isle Hakui (Hakui claims to be the UFO sighting capital of Japan. This is reflected in a number of places around the city, including a UFO shaped street light at the entrance to Hakui Station, and plaques depicting UFOs in the pavement outside the city hall)

References

External links 

  

 
Cities in Ishikawa Prefecture
Populated coastal places in Japan